Elizabeth Parr may refer to:
Elisabeth Parr, Marchioness of Northampton, née Brooke, wife of William Parr
Elizabeth Parr-Johnston, Managing Partner of Parr-Johnston Consultants